Robert Ralph Moose Jr. (October 9, 1947 – October 9, 1976) was an American professional baseball player. He played his entire career in Major League Baseball as a right-handed pitcher for the Pittsburgh Pirates from  through .

Biography

His best season came in 1969 when he posted a 14–3 won-loss record and a 2.91 Earned Run Average working equally as a starter and reliever. On September 20 of that year, he no-hit the eventual World Series champion New York Mets. He is also known for his wild pitch in the bottom half of the ninth inning which allowed George Foster to score the winning run in the fifth and deciding game of the 1972 NLCS, sending the Cincinnati Reds to the World Series after Pittsburgh had a one-run lead entering the bottom of the ninth.

During the 1974 season, Moose suffered a blood clot under the shoulder of his pitching arm. Surgery was required to remove the clot plus one of Moose's ribs.

Death
Moose was killed on his twenty-ninth birthday in a two-vehicle auto accident on Ohio Route 7 in Martins Ferry, as he was returning from a tournament at Bill Mazeroski's golf course in Rayland, Ohio.

See also
List of baseball players who died during their careers
List of Major League Baseball no-hitters
List of Major League Baseball players who spent their entire career with one franchise

References

External links

1947 births
1976 deaths
Pittsburgh Pirates players
Major League Baseball pitchers
Baseball players from Pennsylvania
People from Westmoreland County, Pennsylvania
Road incident deaths in Ohio